Gollancz may refer to:

 Gollancz (surname), a Polish-Jewish surname
 Victor Gollancz Ltd, a former British publishing house, now used as an imprint by the Orion Publishing Group

See also
 Gołańcz, a town in Poland